2004–05 Országos Bajnokság I (men's water polo) was the 99th water polo championship in Hungary.

First stage 

Pld - Played; W - Won; L - Lost; PF - Points for; PA - Points against; Diff - Difference; Pts - Points.

Championship Playoff

European competition Playoff

Relegation Playoff

Sources 
Magyar sportévkönyv 2006

Seasons in Hungarian water polo competitions
Hungary
2004 in water polo
2004 in Hungarian sport
2005 in water polo
2005 in Hungarian sport